Francis William Steane (22 February 1925 – 4 August 2017) was an Australian rules footballer who played with North Melbourne in the Victorian Football League (VFL). Part of the list of players to score his first goal with his first kick.

Notes

External links 

1925 births
2017 deaths
Australian rules footballers from Victoria (Australia)
North Melbourne Football Club players